Moscow City Teachers' Training University is a public university located in Moscow, Russia. It was founded in 1995.

History
In 1993, the Moscow Department of Education proposed to the Russian Ministry of Education a project to create a pedagogical university on the basis of several departments of the Moscow State University for the Humanities. The university was founded on March 1, 1995, by decision of the Moscow Government. The creation of a new pedagogical university was received in two ways: by ordinary Muscovites and by government agencies.

During the first year 1300 students were enrolled to 8 faculties (History and Philology were the first ones) with 17 specialities and 3 forms of studies. Soon the Faculties became 12. Since 1995, the Moscow State Pedagogical University has a post-graduate department, and since 1996 a doctoral department. In 1997, the Samara Branch of the Moscow State Pedagogical University was opened.

In 2006 the Institute of Foreign Languages was opened, based on the Department of English Philology and the Department of Romance and Germanic Philology. In 2010, the Institute of Humanities was created on the basis of the Faculty of History and Philology of Moscow State Pedagogical University. In 2014, the Institute of Culture and Arts was established.

In 2012, the Moscow Humanitarian Pedagogical Institute (MGPU) joined the university, and in 2013, the Moscow State Academy of Business Administration (MGADA) joined the university. In 2014, 10 teacher training colleges became part of Moscow City Pedagogical University. In 2015, the colleges merged into the K.D. Ushinsky Institute for Secondary Vocational Education. In 2019, the Institute creates a laboratory of adolescent development.

The university has about 18,000 students. The university does not have a single complex of buildings, all of its institutes are located in different locations in Moscow and the Moscow region.

MCU enters the QS World University Rankings.

Structure
 Institute of Humanities
 Institute of Natural Science and Sports Technology
 Institute of Law and Administration 
 Institute of Psychology, Sociology and Social Relations
 Institute of secondary professional education
 Institute of Pedagogy and Psychology of Education 
 Institute of Culture and Arts 
 Institute of Foreign Languages 
 Institute of Continuing Education and Institute of System Projects
 Institute of Special Education and Integrated Rehabilitation
 Institute for Digital Education 
 Institute of Business Administration

Notes and references

Universities in Moscow
Teachers colleges in Russia